The 1945–46 season was the 43rd season of competitive football in Belgium. RFC Malinois won their second Premier Division title. The Belgium national football team played their first match at Wembley against England. This was the first season when the Premier Division top scorer ranking was published, with Albert De Cleyn of champion RFC Malinois finishing as top scorer with 40 goals. During the same season, De Cleyn scored 7 goals with Belgium, 5 of which in a game against Luxembourg.

Overview
At the end of the season, R Tilleur FC and RCS Brugeois were relegated to Division I, while RFC Brugeois (Division I A winner) and K Lyra (Division I B winner) were promoted to Premier Division.

UC Centre, Stade Nivellois, Waterschei SV Thor, Belgica FC Edegem and CS Andennais were relegated from Division I to Promotion, to be replaced by SC Menen, Mol Sport, Cappellen FC and Stade Waremmien.

National team

* Belgium score given first

Key
 H = Home match
 A = Away match
 N = On neutral ground
 F = Friendly
 o.g. = own goal

Honours

Final league tables

Premier Division

Top scorer: Albert De Cleyn (RFC Malinois) with 40 goals.

References